Sebring is a city in the south-central Florida and is the county seat of Highlands County, Florida, United States, nicknamed "The City on the Circle", in reference to Circle Drive, the center of the Sebring Downtown Historic District. As of the 2020 census, the population was 10,729. It is the county seat of Highlands County, and is the principal city of the Sebring Metropolitan Statistical Area.

Sebring is the home of the Sebring International Raceway, created on a former airbase, first used in 1950. It hosted the 1959 Formula One United States Grand Prix, but is currently best known as the host of the 12 Hours of Sebring, an annual WeatherTech SportsCar Championship race. Nearby Highlands Hammock State Park is a popular attraction. Additionally, the house where novelist Rex Beach committed suicide is located on one of Sebring's main lakes, Lake Jackson.

History 

Sebring was founded in 1912. It was named after George E. Sebring (1859–1927), a pottery manufacturer from Ohio who developed the city. He had a circular plan as the focal point for the city.  It was chartered by the state of Florida in 1913, and was selected as the county seat of Highlands County when the county was created in 1921. The village of Sebring, Ohio, is also named for George E. Sebring and his family.

On January 23, 2019, a SunTrust Bank branch in Sebring was the site of a mass shooting allegedly perpetrated by Zephen Xaver, a 21-year-old Sebring resident and former correctional officer trainee. Five people were killed by Xaver; four employees of the bank and one customer.

Geography and climate
Water comprises 37.8% of the city's total area.

The city's geography is dominated by  Lake Jackson, but  Dinner Lake and  Little Lake Jackson are also within the city limits. Highlands County has more than 84 lakes, most of which are located in unincorporated areas of the county. Sebring lies near the southern end of the Lake Wales Ridge, a chain of ancient islands that is the native habitat for many rare plants and animals.

Sebring's climate is a humid subtropical climate (Köppen climate classification Cfa), with hot, humid summers and mild, dry winters. Unlike most places with a similar climate classification, Sebring's rainfall is clearly seasonal, with approximately 57 percent of the total rainfall occurring in the June–September summer period. However, the variation between the wettest and driest months does not reach the threshold required for climate classification Cwa, which requires the wettest month to have ten times the precipitation of the driest month.

Demographics

As of the census of 2000, there were 9,667 people, 3,969 households, and 2,305 families residing in the city. The racial makeup of the city was 75.81% White, 15.69% African American, 0.57% Native American, 0.74% Asian, 0.10% Pacific Islander, 5.06% from other races, and 2.02% from two or more races. Hispanic or Latino of any race were 11.00% of the population.

There were 3,969 households, out of which 23.1% had children under the age of 18 living with them, 42.0% were married couples living together, 12.0% had a female householder with no husband present, and 41.9% were non-families. 36.0% of all households were made up of individuals, and 21.0% had someone living alone who was 65 years of age or older. The average household size was 2.25 and the average family size was 2.91.

In the city, the population was spread out, with 22.1% under the age of 18, 7.9% from 18 to 24, 22.8% from 25 to 44, 19.4% from 45 to 64, and 27.7% who were 65 years of age or older. The median age was 42 years. For every 100 females, there were 91.7 males. For every 100 females age 18 and over, there were 88.6 males.

The median income for a household in the city was $23,555, and the median income for a family was $29,915. Males had a median income of $21,799 versus $19,167 for females. The per capita income for the city was $15,125. About 17.4% of families and 23.5% of the population were below the poverty line, including 36.0% of those under age 18 and 12.0% of those age 65 or over.

As of 2000, speakers of English as a first language accounted for 89.39% of residents. Other languages in the city included Spanish, spoken by 10.18% of the city's residents, and French, spoken by 0.42%.

Education
According to the 2001 American Community Survey (conducted by the US Census Bureau), 13.8% of all adults over the age of 25 in Sebring have obtained a bachelor's degree, as compared to a national average of 24.4% of adults over 25, and 64.0% of Sebring residents over the age of 25 have earned a high school diploma, as compared to the national average of 80.4%. This is the lowest rate of any metro area in the United States. The School Board of Highlands County operates eight public schools drawing from the city of Sebring with a combined enrollment of approximately 6200 students; one kindergarten center, four elementary schools (Woodlawn Elementary, Fred Wild Elementary, Cracker Trail Elementary, and Sun 'n Lake Elementary, serving students in 1st through 5th grades), two middle schools (Sebring Middle School, and Hill-Gustat Middle School, serving students in 6th through 8th grades), and one high school (Sebring High School).
One of the elementary schools (Cracker Trail Elementary) received an "A" grade under Florida's A+ school grading plan; two of the elementary schools. Sebring Middle School received a "B", based on pupil results on the Florida Comprehensive Assessment Test.  Sebring High School, home of the county's sole International Baccalaureate program, received a "B" grade.

The county's graduation rate of 62.1% is below the state average of 74.5%, and the dropout rate of 14.8% is above the state average of 4.9%.

During segregation time, E.O. Douglas High School, Home of the Mighty Tigers, was located in this city for Black people throughout Highlands County. The last graduating class from this school was in 1967. After desegregation, students from E.O. Douglas transferred to schools which were formerly whites-only. The E.O. Douglas campus now houses the headquarters of the School Board of Highlands County.

Transportation

Sebring has no interstate highways or other limited access roads. U.S. Route 27 (cosigned with U.S. Route 98 in Sebring) is the major artery providing access to the rest of the state. State Road 17 begins in Sebring and heads north to its terminus in Haines City. State Road 64 (to the north) and State Road 66 (to the south) are important secondary roads. Several of Sebring's streets are named after automobile manufacturers or their models, as is evident in Peugeot Street, Ferrari Drive,  Porsche Avenue, Vantage Terrace, Corvette Avenue, and Thunderbird Road, to name a few.

Sebring Regional Airport is located a few miles southeast of the city and provides general aviation facilities for Sebring. The airport is also the home of the Sebring International Raceway, the host of the 12 Hours of Sebring, second round of WeatherTech SportsCar Championship automobile race series, held annually in March. The airport has also hosted the annual US Sport Aviation Expo for eight years. The nearest regularly scheduled passenger service is provided at Orlando International Airport,  by road to the north.

The city is served by Amtrak from the Sebring station, a depot built in 1924 by the Seaboard Air Line and listed on the National Register of Historic Places. Amtrak's daily service to Sebring consists of two trains each from the Silver Meteor and Silver Star, heading south to Miami and north to Tampa, Orlando and New York City. CSX Transportation owns the track over which Amtrak operates. The South Central Florida Express railroad connects to the CSX line in Sebring, allowing transportation of sugar from Clewiston to the rest of the country.

Media

Television

Sebring is located in a fringe viewing area of the Tampa-St. Petersburg television market (DMA). In addition to the primary Tampa-market television signals, local services offer signals from WFTV, the ABC affiliate in Orlando and WINK, the CBS affiliate in Fort Myers/Naples.

Radio

Sebring is the largest city in the Sebring radio market, which is ranked as the 288th largest in the United States by Arbitron. Radio stations broadcasting from Sebring include WAVP (1390AM), WWLL (105.7FM/Adult Contemporary), WITS (1340AM/Religion ), and WJCM (1050AM/ESPN).
The latter three are co-owned with WWOJ (99.1FM/Country), licensed to neighboring Avon Park and WWTK (730AM/News-Talk), licensed to Lake Placid, to the south. The five stations together operate from studios in Sebring on Highway 27 near the town's northern city limit.

Notable people 
 Rex Beach, olympian and author
 Jacque Fresco, Social engineering
  Gene Harris, former pitcher for the Seattle Mariners.
 Ronnie Lippett, NFL player for New England Patriots
 Parker Lee McDonald, Chief Justice of the Supreme Court of Florida
 Ralph McGill, NFL player for San Francisco 49ers
 Major Thomas B. McGuire Jr., World War II fighter ace, Medal of Honor recipient
 Frankie Neal, NFL player
 Eliot Teltscher, professional tennis player
 Cornelia Wallace, First Lady of Alabama 1971–1978
 Gabe White, Major League Baseball player.

References

External links

 City of Sebring official website
 Sebring Chamber of Commerce
 Sebring High School
 Sebring Public Library
 News-Sun
 Highlands Today
 
 Municipal code

 
County seats in Florida
Cities in Highlands County, Florida
Micropolitan areas of Florida
Populated places established in 1912
1912 establishments in Florida
Cities in Florida